

The Aeromot AMT-300 Turbo Ximango Shark is a Brazilian motor glider manufactured by the aerospace company Aeromot.

Design and development
It is a single piston engine, and one of the improved versions of the Aeromot Ximango family of motor gliders, also with composite structure and conventional retractable landing gear, also designed to carry one pilot and one passenger on short trips.

Variants
AMT-300P Polícia Version for military and police use for observation and reconnaissance. 
AMT-300R Reboque Gliger tug version

Specification

See also

References

Bibliography

External links
 .

1990s Brazilian sport aircraft
Motor gliders
Low-wing aircraft
Single-engined tractor aircraft
T-tail aircraft
Aircraft first flown in 1997